Evie Richards (born 11 March 1997) is a British cyclist from Malvern, Worcestershire, England who specialises in mountain bike and cyclo-cross racing. who became the women's cross-country world champion at the 2021 Mountain Bike World Championships. Previously, Richards had been under-23 cyclo-cross world champion at the 2016 and 2018 World Championships. In 2022, Richards added a first Commonwealth Games gold in cross-country mountain bike to her palmarès.

Life
Richards comes from Malvern and attended The Chase School. She first rode for T-Mo Racing. She is a member of the British Cycling Olympic Senior Academy.

She took the silver medal position in the junior cross-country race at the 2015 mountain bike World Championships, held in Vallnoord, Andorra in September 2015.

Prior to 2016 under-23 cyclo-cross events were only held for male competitors, Richards therefore raced in the elite category. After the introduction of under-23 events, Richards won the first three editions (2016, 2017, 2018) of the British National Cyclo-cross Championships. In addition, she was 7th in the women's elite category and 2nd in the junior category in the British national cyclo-cross championships in 2015.

On 30 January 2016, Richards won the first ever women's U23 competition at the cyclo-cross world championships in Zolder, Belgium. She broke away in the first lap and finished the race 35 seconds ahead of the second-placed rider, Nikola Noskova. It was the first cyclo-cross race Richards had taken part in outside the UK.

Richards was chosen to be part of the UK's cycling squad at the postponed 2020 Tokyo Olympics where she achieved a 7th place finish.

Major results

Mountain Bike

2014
 2nd Cross-country, National Junior Championships
2015
 2nd  Cross-country, UCI World Junior Championships
2016
 1st  Cross-country, National Under-23 Championships
 National XCO Series
1st Builth Wells
1st Dalby Forest
1st Plymouth
 1st Int. KitzAlpBike-Festival
 UCI Under-23 XCO World Cup
2nd Albstadt
2nd La Bresse
 Internazionali d'Italia Series
2nd Milan
 3rd  Cross-country, UEC European Under-23 Championships
2017
 1st  Cross-country, National Under-23 Championships
 3rd Overall UCI Under-23 XCO World Cup
1st Albstadt
2nd Nové Město
3rd Vallnord
3rd Lenzerheide
3rd Val di Sole
 Copa Catalana Internacional
1st Vall de Boi
 National XCO Series
1st Llanelli
1st Richmond
2018
 1st  Cross-country, National Under-23 Championships
 National XCO Series
1st Builth Wells
 2nd  Cross–country, Commonwealth Games
 Internazionali d’Italia Series
2nd Chies d'Alpago
 3rd Overall UCI Under-23 XCO World Cup
2nd Albstadt
2nd Val di Sole
2nd Vallnord
2nd Mont-Sainte-Anne
2nd La Bresse
3rd Stellenbosch
2019
 1st  Cross-country, National Under-23 Championships
 3rd Overall UCI Under-23 XCO World Cup
1st Snowshoe
2nd Vallnord
2nd Les Gets
2nd Val di Sole
 Internazionali d'Italia Series
1st La Thuile
 Swiss Bike Cup
2nd Andermatt
 National XCO Series
2nd Cannock Chase
2020
 UCI XCC World Cup
1st Nové Město #1
1st Nové Město #2
 Copa Catalana Internacional
1st Banyoles
 3rd Overall Cyprus Sunshine Epic
2021
 UCI World Championships
1st  Cross-country
2nd  Short track
 2nd Overall UCI XCO World Cup
1st Lenzerheide
1st Snowshoe
3rd Les Gets
 UCI XCC World Cup
1st Snowshoe
2nd Lenzerheide
 Swiss Bike Cup
1st Gränichen
 Internazionali d’Italia Series
1st La Thuile
 Copa Catalana Internacional
1st Banyoles
2022
 1st  Cross–country, Commonwealth Games
 Copa Catalana Internacional
1st Banyoles
 National Championships
2nd Cross-country 
2nd Short track
 2nd Overall Mediterranean Epic
 UCI XCC World Cup
3rd Petrópolis
 Internazionali d'Italia Series
3rd La Thuile
 CIMTB Michelin
3rd Petrópolis
2023
 2nd Chelva
 Shimano Super Cup Massi
3rd Banyoles

UCI World Cup results

Cyclo-cross

2014–2015
 2nd National Junior Championships
2015–2016
 1st  UCI World Under-23 Championships
 1st  National Under-23 Championships
 National Trophy Series
1st Bradford
2016–2017
 1st  National Under-23 Championships
 National Trophy Series
1st Abergavenny
 3rd  UCI World Under-23 Championships
2017–2018
 1st  UCI World Under-23 Championships
 1st  National Under-23 Championships
 UCI World Cup
1st Namur
3rd Hoogerheide
2018–2019
 1st Waterloo
 UCI World Cup
2nd Iowa City
2019–2020
 UCI World Cup
3rd Waterloo
 3rd Iowa City

References

External links

 
 
 
 
 
 
 
 
 

1997 births
Living people
English female cyclists
Cyclo-cross cyclists
People from Malvern, Worcestershire
Commonwealth Games medallists in cycling
Commonwealth Games silver medallists for England
Cyclists at the 2018 Commonwealth Games
Sportspeople from Worcestershire
Olympic cyclists of Great Britain
Cyclists at the 2020 Summer Olympics
20th-century British women
21st-century British women
Cyclists at the 2022 Commonwealth Games
Commonwealth Games gold medallists for England
Medallists at the 2018 Commonwealth Games
Medallists at the 2022 Commonwealth Games